Virtual State is Richard H. Kirk's first solo album for Warp Records.

Track listing
"November X Ray Mexico" - 8:33
"Frequency Band" - 6:26
"Come" - 8:02
"Freezone" - 6:52
"Clandestine Transmission" - 6:36
"The Feeling (Of Warmth and Beauty)" - 6:08
"Velodrome" - 6:56
"Soul Catcher" - 7:08
"Worldwar Three" - 5:52
"Lagoon West" - 12:00

Personnel

Richard H. Kirk - all instruments

1993 albums
Richard H. Kirk albums
Warp (record label) albums